Leonard Shuter may refer to:
 Leonard Shuter (cricketer, born 1852) (1852–1928), English cricketer
 Leonard Shuter (cricketer, born 1887) (1887–1960), his son, English cricketer